Barani (also Romanized as Bārānī) is a village in Rudkhaneh Bar Rural District, Rudkhaneh District, Rudan County, Hormozgan Province, Iran. At the 2006 census, its population was 160, in 37 families.

References 

Populated places in Rudan County